This is a summary of the year 2008 in the Canadian music industry.

Events
 April 6 – Juno Awards of 2008 held
 June 12 – 2008 Polaris Music Prize longlist announced
 June 15 – 2008 MuchMusic Video Awards held
 July 7 – 2008 Polaris Music Prize shortlist announced
 September 29 – Caribou's Andorra wins the Polaris Music Prize.

Albums

A
 Bryan Adams, 11
 Amylie, Jusqu'aux oreilles
 The Awkward Stage, Slimming Mirrors, Flattering Lights

B
 Jill Barber, Chances
 Matthew Barber, Ghost Notes
 Barenaked Ladies, Snacktime!
 Laura Barrett, Victory Garden
 Daniel Bélanger, Joli chaos
 Billy Talent, 666
 Black Mountain, In the Future
 Bonjour Brumaire, De la Nature des Foules
 Born Ruffians, Red, Yellow & Blue
 Isabelle Boulay, Nos Lendemains
 The Buttless Chaps, Cartography

C

 Cadence Weapon, Afterparty Babies
 Cancer Bats, Hail Destroyer
 Brendan Canning, Something for All of Us
 Paul Cargnello, Bragging
 Castlemusic, You Can't Take Anyone
 Chic Gamine, Chic Gamine
 Annabelle Chvostek, Resilience
 City and Colour, Bring Me Your Love
 Cœur de pirate, Cœur de pirate
 Jason Collett, Here's to Being Here
 Constantines, Kensington Heights
 Antoine Corriveau, Entre quatre murs
 Crystal Castles, Crystal Castles
 Isabelle Cyr, Isabelle Cyr

D
 The Dears, Missiles
 Destroyer, Trouble in Dreams
 Die Mannequin, Unicorn Steak
 DL Incognito, A Captured Moment in Time
 Luke Doucet, Blood's Too Rich
 The D'Urbervilles, We Are the Hunters

E
 Fred Eaglesmith, Tinderbox
 Kathleen Edwards, Asking for Flowers
 Elliott Brood, Mountain Meadows
 André Ethier, Born of Blue Fog

F
 FemBots, Calling Out
 Forest City Lovers, Haunting Moon Sinking

G

 Great Big Sea, Fortune's Favour

H

 Hawk Nelson, Hawk Nelson Is My Friend
 Hayden, In Field & Town
 Hello, Blue Roses, The Portrait Is Finished and I Have Failed to Capture Your Beauty...
 Hey Rosetta!, Into Your Lungs
 Veda Hille, This Riot Life
 Hilotrons, Happymatic
 Human Highway, Moody Motorcycle

I

 Islands, Arm's Way

J

 Danko Jones, Never Too Loud

K
 Kardinal Offishall, Not 4 Sale
 Kalle Mattson, Telescope
 Karkwa, Le volume du vent
 Kellarissa, Flamingo
 Koriass, Les racines dans le béton
 Keith Kouna, Les Années monsieur

L
 Land of Talk, Some Are Lakes
 Éric Lapointe, Ma peau
 Library Voices, Hunting Ghosts (& Other Collected Shorts)
 The Lost Fingers, Lost in the 80s
 Rob Lutes, Truth & Fiction

M
 Catherine Major, Rose sang
 Kate Maki, On High
 Sarah McLachlan, Closer: The Best of Sarah McLachlan
 Millimetrik, Northwest Passage's New Era (LP), Keys (EP)
 Ariane Moffatt, Tous les sens
 Alanis Morissette, Flavors of Entanglement

N
 Nickelback, Dark Horse
 Novillero, A Little Tradition

O
 One Hundred Dollars, Forest of Tears

P
 Pas Chic Chic, Au Contraire
 Philémon Cimon, EP 2008
 Dany Placard, Raccourci 
 Plants and Animals, Parc Avenue
 Prism, Big Black Sky
 Protest the Hero, Fortress
 The Provincial Archive, Nameless Places

R

 Sam Roberts, Love at the End of the World
 Justin Rutledge, Man Descending

S
 Said The Whale, Howe Sounds/Taking Abalonia
 Ron Sexsmith, Exit Strategy of the Soul
 Thee Silver Mt. Zion Memorial Orchestra & Tra-La-La Band, 13 Blues for Thirteen Moons
 Crystal Shawanda, Dawn of a New Day
 Simple Plan, Simple Plan
 Zal Sissokho, Silaba
 Sloan, Parallel Play
 Snailhouse, Lies on the Prize
 Spirit of the West, Spirituality 1983-2008: The Consummate Compendium
 Stars, Sad Robots
 The Stills, Oceans Will Rise
 Jeffery Straker, Step Right Up 
 Sweatshop Union, Water Street

T
 Theory of a Deadman, Scars & Souvenirs
 Tokyo Police Club, Elephant Shell
 The Trews, No Time for Later

V
 Chad VanGaalen, Soft Airplane

W
 Martha Wainwright, I Know You're Married But I've Got Feelings Too
 Andrée Watters, Minuit
 Wolf Parade, At Mount Zoomer
 Woodhands, Heart Attack
 Hawksley Workman, Between the Beautifuls and Los Manlicious

Top hits on record

Top 10 albums
These are the top selling albums in Canada. These albums consist of Canadian sales only.

Top 10 American albums

Top 5 British albums

Top International albums

Canadian Hot 100 Year-End List

Deaths
 January 4 – Mort Garson, composer
 February 15 – Willie P. Bennett, folk singer-songwriter
 March 2 – Jeff Healey, blues guitarist
 May 11 – John Rutsey, former drummer for Rush
 July 3 – Oliver Schroer, fiddler and composer

References